Timothy D. Haugh is a United States Air Force lieutenant general who serves as the deputy commander of the United States Cyber Command. He previously commanded the Sixteenth Air Force from 2019 to 2022.

Effective dates of promotions

References

 

 
 

 

Living people
Year of birth missing (living people)
Place of birth missing (living people)
Lehigh University alumni
Southern Methodist University alumni
Naval Postgraduate School alumni
Dwight D. Eisenhower School for National Security and Resource Strategy alumni
United States Air Force generals
Lieutenant generals